Viru Keskus (or Viru Centre) is a shopping and entertainment centre in Tallinn, Estonia. By the number of visitors, it is the biggest shopping centre in Estonia. The centre is the largest beauty products' and jewellery area in the Baltic States.

The centre was opened in 2004. The cost was 700 million kroons. A glass tunnel was installed between the buildings to connect Tallinna Kaubamaja and Viru Keskus.

The Viru Hotel (nowadays known as Sokos Hotel Viru) is located next to the centre.

Awards
2004 Development Project of the Year
2004 Best Service Provider
2006 Best Service Provider

References

External links

2004 establishments in Estonia
Buildings and structures in Tallinn
Shopping centres in Estonia
Shopping malls established in 2004
Tourist attractions in Tallinn